Dariusz Kałuża (born in 1967 in Pszczyna) is a Polish clergyman and bishop for the Roman Catholic Diocese of Goroka. He was appointed bishop in 2016. He resigned and left to serve the same role in Bougainville in 2020.

References

External links 

1967 births
Polish Roman Catholic bishops
Roman Catholic bishops of Goroka
Roman Catholic bishops of Bougainville
Living people